The Banquet of Chestnuts (sometimes Ballet of Chestnuts, Festival of Chestnuts, or Joust of Whores) was a  supper purportedly held at the Papal Palace in Rome and hosted by former Cardinal Cesare Borgia, son of Pope Alexander VI on 31 October 1501. An account of the banquet is presented in a Latin diary by Protonotary Apostolic and Master of Ceremonies Johann Burchard (it is titled Liber Notarum), but its accuracy is disputed.

History
According to Burchard, the banquet was given in Cesare's apartments in the Palazzo Apostolico. Fifty prostitutes or courtesans were in attendance for the entertainment of the banquet guests. Burchard describes the scene in his Diary:

Alexander Lee notes that, "The so-called 'Banquet of the Chestnuts' ... is, for example, attested only in Burchard's memoirs, and not only was intrinsically implausible, but also was dismissed as such by many contemporaries."

De Roo interpretation
Vatican researcher Right Reverend Monsignor Peter de Roo (1839–1926), rejected the story of the "fifty courtesans" as described in Louis Thuasne's edition of Burchard's diary (vol. 3). While granting that Cesare Borgia may have indeed given a feast at the Vatican, de Roo attempts, through exhaustive research, to refute the notion that the Borgias – certainly not the pope – could have possibly participated in "a scene truly bestial" such as Burchard describes, on grounds that it would be inconsistent with:
Alexander VI's essentially decent but much maligned character
Burchard's otherwise "decent ways" of writing
The majority consensus of writers at the time, who either questioned the story, or rejected it as outright falsehood.

De Roo believes that a more credible explanation for the alleged "orgy" is a later interpolation of events by those hostile to Alexander:

In popular culture
William Manchester's book A World Lit Only by Fire, embellishes the story: "Servants kept score of each man's orgasms, for the pope greatly admired virility and measured a man's machismo by his ejaculative capacity.... After everyone was exhausted, His Holiness distributed prizes." Professional historians, however, have dismissed or ignored the book because of its numerous factual errors and its dependence on interpretations that have not been accepted by experts since the 1930s at the latest. In a review for Speculum, the journal of the Medieval Academy of America, Jeremy duQuesnay Adams remarked that Manchester's work contained "some of the most gratuitous errors of fact and eccentricities of judgment this reviewer has read (or heard) in quite some time."

The banquet is depicted in episode 4 of season 3 of the Showtime TV series The Borgias. In the show, the Banquet is shown to be a trap to blackmail otherwise disloyal members of the College of Cardinals, and is officiated by Giulia Farnese, and witnessed by Burchard who chronicles the debaucheries of the Cardinals while hidden behind a screen. None of the Borgia family are seen to be present, and loyal Cardinals such as Cardinal Farnese are warned not to accept the invitation.

See also
 List of dining events
 List of sexually active popes
 House of Borgia
 Route of the Borgias

References

Bibliography
John (Johann) Burchard, Pope Alexander VI and his Court: extracts from the Latin diary of the Papal Master of Ceremonies, 1484–1506; ed. F. L. Glaser, New York, 1921
Barbara W. Tuchman, The March of Folly. New York: Knopf, 1984; p. 106 ; another issue has 
Burgo Partridge, A History of Orgies, Bonanza Books, 1960, p. 106

History of Catholicism in Italy
Sexuality in Catholicism
Renaissance Rome
16th-century Catholicism
16th-century Christianity
1501 in Italy
16th century in Rome
1501 in Christianity
History of the papacy